Statistics of the Scottish Football League in season 1928–29.

Scottish League Division One

Scottish League Division Two

See also
1928–29 in Scottish football

References

 
Scottish Football League seasons